The Cavan Orphanage fire occurred on the night of 23 February 1943 at St Joseph's Orphanage in Cavan, Ireland. 35 children and 1 adult employee died as a result. Much of the attention after the fire surrounded the role of the Poor Clares, the order of nuns who ran the orphanage, and the local fire service.

History of the orphanage
The Poor Clares, an enclosed contemplative order, founded a convent in Cavan in 1861 in a large premises on Main Street. In 1868 they opened an orphanage, designed by William Hague Jnr. At that time young petty criminals could be educated and learn a trade in a reformatory; however, orphaned and abandoned children were not accorded the same opportunity. The Industrial Schools Act 1868 sought to address this by the establishment of the industrial school system. In 1869 a school, attached to the convent, was established and became known as the St. Joseph's Orphanage & Industrial School.

Events of 24 February 1943
A fire started in the early morning hours of 24 February 1943 in the basement laundry and was not noticed until about 2 a.m. The subsequent investigation attributed it to a faulty flue. The sight of smoke coming out of the building alerted people on Main Street. They went to the front entrance and tried to gain entry. Eventually they were let in by one of the girls (Rosemary Caffrey) but not knowing the layout of the convent, they were unable to find the girls.

By this time all of the girls had been moved into one dormitory. At this stage it would have been possible to evacuate all of the children but instead the nuns persuaded the local people to attempt to put out the fire. It has been widely claimed that the reason the orphans were not evacuated was that the nuns did not think it "decent" for the girls to be seen in public in their nightgowns.

Two men (John Kennedy and John McNally) went down to the laundry to try to put the fire out. The flames were now too intense for this to be possible and McNally only survived by being carried out by Kennedy.

By this point it was no longer possible for the girls to get out through the main entrance or the fire escape. The local fire brigade had then arrived but their equipment was not sufficient for this fire. Wooden ladders were not long enough to reach the dormitory windows. In the absence of any other solution girls were encouraged to jump. Three did so, though with injuries; however, most were too frightened to attempt it. At some point, a local electricity worker, Mattie Hand, arrived with a long ladder, and a local man, Louis Blessing, brought five girls down. One child left by way of the interior staircase while it was still accessible. One child made it down the exterior fire escape. One child escaped by way of a small ladder held on the roof of the shed. The fire completely engulfed the dormitory and the remaining girls died.

Casualties
The following 35 children died:

 Mary and Nora Barrett (12-year-old twins from Dublin)
 Mary Brady (7 years old from Ballinagh)
 Josephine and Mary Carroll (10 and 12 years old, respectively, from Castlerahan)
 Josephine and Mona Cassidy (15 and 11 years old, respectively, from Belfast)
 Katherine and Margaret Chambers (9 and 7 years old, respectively, from Enniskillen)
 Dorothy Daly (7 years old from Cootehill)
 Bridget and Mary Galligan (17 and 18 years old, respectively, from Drumcassidy, Co Cavan)
 Mary Harrison (15 years old from Dublin)
 Elizabeth Heaphy (4 years old from Swords)
 Mary Hughes (15 years old from Killeshandra)
 Mary Ivers (12 years old from Kilcoole, Co Wicklow)
 Mary Kelly (10 years old from Ballinagh)
 Frances and Kathleen Kiely (9 and 12 years old, respectively, from Virginia)
 Mary Lowry (17 years old from Drumcrow, Co Cavan)
 Margaret and Mary Lynch (10 years and 15 years, Cavan)
 Ellen McHugh (15 years old from Blacklion)
 Mary Elizabeth and Susan McKiernan (16 and 14 years old, respectively, from Dromard, Co Sligo)
 Ellen Morgan (10 years old from Virginia)
 Mary O'Hara (7 years old from Kilnaleck)
 Ellen and Harriet Payne (8 and 11 years old, respectively, from Dublin)
 Philomena Regan (9 years old from Dublin)
 Kathleen Reilly (14 years old from Butlersbridge)
 Mary Roche (6 years old from Dublin)
 Bernadette Serridge (5 years old from Dublin)
 Teresa White (6 years old from Dublin)
 Rose Wright (11 years old from Ballyjamesduff)

The one adult who died was 80-year-old Mary Smith, who was employed as a cook.

Aftermath and inquiry

Over concerns about the causes of the fire and the standard of care, a public inquiry was set up. The report's findings stated that the loss of life occurred due to faulty directions being given, lack of fire-fighting training, and an inadequate rescue and fire-fighting service. It also noted inadequate training of staff in fire safety and evacuation, both at the orphanage and local fire service.

This finding has been disputed by many, including in a limerick written by the secretary to the inquiry, Brian O'Nolan, better known as the author Flann O'Brien, and one of the counsel representing the Electricity Supply Board, Tom O'Higgins, later Chief Justice of the Supreme Court and presidential candidate.

It was alleged that the nuns prevented firefighters entering the building in case they saw the girls inside in a state of undress. Also, the structure of the orphanage, with many locked and barred doors, has been compared to a "fortress", presumably intended to safeguard the chastity of the inmates.

Due to the nature of the fire, the remains of the dead girls were placed in 8 coffins and buried in Cullies cemetery in Cavan. A new memorial plaque was erected in 2010 just inside the convent gates at Main Street, Cavan. The plaque was anonymously donated to the Friends of the Cavan Orphanage Victims group

Response to the fire
The town did not have any sort of formal or professional fire brigade. Although the stand-pipes connected to the public water main had recently been improved and increased, the apparatus for delivering water was wholly unsuitable – little more than a cart and a hose pipe (which, according to the inquiry, may have been faulty). The council had attempted to obtain a trailer pump, but this had been delayed by the war emergency. There was no pumping equipment and formal, organised structure of fire officers. On the night of the fire, the brigade in Dundalk was summoned by telephone. By the time the Dundalk Fire Brigade (which was a professional unit) had covered the forty-five or so miles of twisting road, there was nothing to be done. Enniskillen is about ten miles closer to Cavan than Dundalk and the roads are more direct. However, there is nothing to suggest that the Enniskillen Fire Brigade was summoned, even though Northern fire brigades had in the past crossed the border to assist in the South.

In 1950, as a direct result of the inquiry, the Department of Local Government issued a forty-seven-page fire safety recommendation entitled Fire Protection Standards for Public Buildings and Institutions. Its safety instructions covered areas for which "a Department of State has any responsibility or for which [it] has power to make rules or regulations in respect of the maintenance of inmates."

See also
 2002 Mecca girls' school fire

References

Footnotes

Further reading

Jolly, Alice (2020). From Far Around They Saw Us Burn. Ploughshares.

External links
Seanad Éireann Cavan Fire Inquiry—Motion
From the Department of the Taoiseach Files on Cavan Fire 1943
Report of the tribunal of inquiry into the fire at st. Joseph's orphanage, Main Street, Cavan, 23 Feb. 1943

1943 disasters in Ireland
1943 fires in Europe
1943 in the Republic of Ireland
Cavan (town)
Fires in the Republic of Ireland
History of Catholicism in Ireland
History of County Cavan
Public inquiries in Ireland
Scandals in the Republic of Ireland